Slippery Rock Township is a township in Butler County, Pennsylvania, United States. The population was 5,614 at the 2010 census.

The township takes its name from Slippery Rock Creek, which flows through its borders.

Geography
Slippery Rock Township is located along the northwestern border of Butler County, with Mercer and Lawrence counties to the northwest. The township surrounds the borough of Slippery Rock but is a separate entity. Slippery Rock University straddles the border between the township and the borough. The unincorporated community of Doughertys Mills is in the southern part of the township, along Slippery Rock Creek, and Branchton is near the township's eastern border.

Demographics

As of the census of 2000, there were 5,251 people, 1,337 households, and 776 families residing in the township.  The population density was 203.1 people per square mile (78.4/km2).  There were 1,470 housing units at an average density of 56.9/sq mi (22.0/km2).  The racial makeup of the township was 95.54% White, 2.29% African American, 0.06% Native American, 1.09% Asian, 0.13% from other races, and 0.90% from two or more races. Hispanic or Latino of any race were 0.72% of the population.

There were 1,337 households, out of which 24.2% had children under the age of 18 living with them, 49.1% were married couples living together, 6.4% had a female householder with no husband present, and 41.9% were non-families. 19.8% of all households were made up of individuals, and 5.6% had someone living alone who was 65 years of age or older.  The average household size was 2.52 and the average family size was 2.94.

In the township the population was spread out, with 11.8% under the age of 18, 50.6% from 18 to 24, 16.8% from 25 to 44, 13.5% from 45 to 64, and 7.2% who were 65 years of age or older.  The median age was 21 years. For every 100 females there were 94.5 males.  For every 100 females age 18 and over, there were 91.8 males.

The median income for a household in the township was $31,223, and the median income for a family was $46,136. Males had a median income of $40,095 versus $23,281 for females. The per capita income for the township was $11,129.  About 14.3% of families and 29.4% of the population were below the poverty line, including 7.6% of those under age 18 and 40.9% of those age 65 or over.

References

External links 
 Township website
 Early history of Slippery Rock Township

Populated places established in 1796
Townships in Butler County, Pennsylvania
1800 establishments in Pennsylvania